Sapudi is a dialect of Madurese language spoken in Sapudi Island, Sumenep Regency, East Java, Indonesia. This language is the main language used by the Madurese people on Sapudi Island.

References

Madurese language